Shekhar Gawli (6 August 1975 – 1 September 2020) was an Indian cricketer who played in two first-class matches for Maharashtra. He died in September 2020, after falling into a gorge.

See also
 List of Maharashtra cricketers

References

External links
 

1975 births
2020 deaths
Indian cricketers
Maharashtra cricketers
Place of birth missing
Place of death missing
Accidental deaths from falls